is a Japanese rock band signed by Sony Music Japan. The band's name, Sambomaster, refers to the Russian martial art called Sambo.

History
Lead vocalist and guitarist Takashi Yamaguchi first met drummer Yasufumi Kiuchi at a university music club where they were both members. The duo ran into bassist Yoichi Kondo during February 2000, and the three went on to officially form the band now known as Sambomaster. They made their debut at a live house in Tokyo's Kōenji district and soon followed this up with the self-production of their first single "Kick no Oni" (Kicking Demons), which they spent nearly a year working on. It was subsequently released in April 2001 as a limited edition of 300 copies. For the first time, listeners outside of a live show were presented with vocalist and frontman Yamaguchi's vocals, which shift between a soft, sandpaper-like melodic voice to all-out screaming madness. Sambomaster's musical style is a blend of punk/classic rock, pop, jazz and rock ballads.
The year 2003 saw the release of their very first major-label album, Atarashiki Nihongo Rock no Michi to Hikari and a live performance at the Fuji Rock festival's Rookie GO GO. This led to a huge rise in their success and more widespread notoriety. They have been gathering acclaim from both critics and regular listeners ever since.

In 2004 and 2005, Sambomaster released the majority of their hit singles including "Seishun Kyōsōkyoku" and "Sekai wa Sore wo Ai to Yobundaze"; "Seishun Kyōsōkyoku" was used as the fifth opening theme to the hit anime series Naruto, and "Sekai wa sore Ai to Yobunda ze" ended up being the ending theme to the popular Japanese television drama Densha Otoko (and also Nintendo DS game Moero! Nekketsu Rhythm Damashii Osu! Tatakae! Ouendan 2). They were also asked to do the main theme to the movie Koi no Mon, which became the song Tsuki ni Saku Hana no Yō ni Naru no. Recently, their song Hikari no Rock was featured as the single for the film Bleach: The DiamondDust Rebellion. In March 2009, their song "Kimi wo Mamotte, Kimi wo Aishite" was announced to be the nineteenth ending song in the hit anime series Bleach. In 2010, they performed the ending theme for the Kuragehime anime, "Kimi no Kirei ni Kizuite Okure". In 2018, their song "Love Song" was used as the ending theme for Tada Never Falls In Love, being covered by the voice actors for the male and female leads.

Parody
In March 2005, 3 members of the television variety show Haneru no Tobira ("You Knock on a Jumping Door!") filmed a comedy sketch called "Busambomaster". The sketch featured a music video parody of the 3 Haneru members pretending to be Sambomaster, playing a Sambomaster-style song called "Iitai koto mo iezuni" (English: "Not even saying what I want to say"). However, the 3 Haneru members also made their faces look like caricatures of Yamaguchi, Kiuichi, and Kondo, with features such as enlarged nostrils, buck teeth, and profuse sweating. The lyrics of the song were also made to humiliate lead vocalist Yamaguchi's tendency to scream his thoughts out to fans before and after songs (and sometimes in the middle of songs). Many Sambomaster fans were offended by the song, and after much protesting, Haneru no Tobira eventually apologized on their show.

Members
Takashi Yamaguchi  (山口隆 Yamaguchi Takashi)

Yasufumi Kiuchi  (木内泰史 Kiuchi Yasufumi)

Yoichi Kondo  (近藤洋一 Kondo Yoichi)

Discography

Singles
"Kick no Oni" (indie) (April 2001)
 Introduction
 Kung-fu Rock
 Golden Circle no Ornette Coleman
 Kick no Oni
 Saikyō Cyclone
 Tsunagari
 Sambomaster no Kyūjitsu
YUrnero prO

"Utsukushiki Ningen no Hibi" (April 7, 2004)
 Utsukushiki Ningen no Hibi
 Netchū Jidai
 Dandan
 Sono Nukumori ni Yō ga Aru (studio live version)

"Tsuki ni Saku Hana no Yō ni Naru no" (July 22, 2004)
 Tsuki ni Saku Hana no Yō ni Naru no
 Tegami (King of Soul mix)
 Itoshiki Hibi (Nashville Skyline version)
 Hito wa Sore o Jounetsu to Yobu (live version)

"Seishun Kyōsōkyoku" (December 1, 2004)
 Seishun Kyōsōkyoku
 Tsunagari (King of Laidback mix)
 Ame
 Seishun Kyōsōkyoku (Naruto opening mix)

"Utagoe yoo kore" (April 27, 2005)
 Utagoe yoo kore
 Sad Ballad no Sekai
 Seishun Kyōsōkyoku (live version)

"Sekai wa Sore wo Ai to Yobundaze" (August 3, 2005)
 Sekai wa Sore o Ai to Yobunda ze
 Atsui Suna to Warui Ame
 Boku ni Sasagu

"Subete no Yoru to Subete no Asa ni Tamborine o Narasu no da" (November 2, 2005)
 Subete no Yoru to Subete no Asa ni Tambourine o Narasu no da
 Ano Kane o Narasu no wa Anata
 Hanarenai Futari

"Tegami" (March 15, 2006)
 Tegami: Kitarubeki Ongaku to Shite
 Get Back Sambomaster
 Yoyogi nite

"Itoshisa to Kokoro no Kabe" (August 2, 2006)
 Itoshisa to Kokoro no Kabe
 Sekai wa Sore o Ai to Yobunda ze (live version)

"I Love You" (April 18, 2007)
 I Love You
 Beibi Beibi Su
 Coaster
 Kyōkai Mae Tōri

"Very Special!!" (July 25, 2007)
 Very Special!!
 Ubai Toru Koto Nitsuite
 Utsukushiki Ningen no Hibi (Sekai Rokku Senbatsu version)

"Hikari no Rock" (December 12, 2007) (theme song for BLEACH: The DiamondDust Rebellion)
 Hikari no Rock
 Hikari no Rock (Instrumental)

"Kimi wo Mamotte, Kimi wo Aishite" (June 10, 2009) (19th ending theme for Bleach)
 Kimi wo Mamotte, Kimi wo Aishite
 Akashi
 Boku wa Jiyuu
 Kimi wo Mamotte, Kimi wo Aishite (Bleach Version)

"Rabu Songu" (November 18, 2009) (English: Love Song)
 Rabu Songu
 Sekai wo Kaesasete okure yo
 Rabu Songu (Instrumental)
 Sekai wo Kaesasete okure yo (Instrumental)

"Dekikkonai o Yaranakucha" (February 24, 2010)
 Dekikkonai o Yaranakucha
 Pop Life
 Boku no Namae wa Blues to iimasu
 Dekikkonai o Yaranakucha (Instrumental)

"Kimi ni Kirei no Kizuite okure" (December 1, 2010)
 Kimi ni Kirei no Kizuite okure (Kuragehime ED)
 Introduction
 Sekai wo Kaesasete okure yo (live version)
 Zanzou (Live Version)
 Kore de Jiyuu ni natta no Da (live version)
 MC (Live Version)
 Love Song (Live Version)
 Sono Nukumori ni You ga aru (live version)
 Dekikkonai wo Yaranakucha (live version)

"Kibo no Michi" (February 23, 2011)
 Kibo bo Michi
 Intro
 Utagoe yo okore
 Tsuki ni saku Hana no You ni naru no
 MC 1
 Baby Yasashi Yoru ga Kitte
 Sayounara Baby
 Sekai wa sore wo Ai to Yobunda ze
 MC 2
 Utsukushiki Ningen no Hibi
 Outro

Albums
Atarashiki Nihongo Rock no Michi to Hikari (December 12, 2003)
English: The Way and Light of New Japanese Rock

Sambomaster wa kimi ni katarikakeru (January 19, 2005)
English: Sambomaster Is Talking to You

Boku to Kimi no Subete o Rock 'n Roll to Yobe (April 12, 2006)
English: Call Everything That We (You and I) Are 'Rock n' Roll

Ongaku no Kodomo wa Mina Utau (January 23, 2008)
English: All You Musical Kids, Sing

Kimi no Tameni Tsuyoku Naritai (April 21, 2010)

Sambomaster Kyukyou Besuto (February 23, 2011)

Sambomaster to Kimi (2015)

YES (March 20, 2018)

Concert DVDs
Atarashiki Nihongo Rock o Kimi ni Katarikakeru: Sambomaster Shoki no Live Eizōshū (November 2, 2005)

A UMD version with the same track list was released on November 30, 2005.
 Kung-fu Rock: Aware na Bobu Isoide Ike yo
 Itoshiki Hibi: Futari
 Zanzō
 Yogisha de Yattekita Aitsu: Sono Nukumori ni Yō ga Aru
 Yogisha de Yattekita Aitsu
 Hito wa Sore o Jonetsu to Yobu
 Utsukushiki Ningen no Hibi
 Itoshiki Hibi
 Sono Nukumori ni Yō ga Aru
 Asa
 Seishun Kyōsōkyoku
 Tegami
 Yokubō Rock
 Sayonara Baby
 Utagoe yoo kore
 Korede Jiyū ni Natta no Da
 Shūmatsu Soul
 Sono Nukumori ni Yō ga Aru
 Tsuki ni Saku Hana no Yō ni Naru no

Atarashiki Nihongo Rock no Video Clip Collection (October 18, 2006)
(Videoclip) Sono Nukumori ni Yō ga Aru
(Videoclip) Sono Nukumori ni Yō ga Aru (Studio Live Version)
(Videoclip) Utsukushiki Ningen no Hibi
(Videoclip) Tsuki ni Saku Hana no Yō ni Naru no
(Videoclip) Seishun Kyōsōkyoku (Haikyo Version)
(Videoclip) Seishun Kyōsōkyoku (Samba Version)
(Videoclip) Utagoe yo Okore
(Videoclip) Sekai wa Sore o Ai to Yobunda ze
(Videoclip) Subete no Yoru to Subete no Asa ni Tambourine o Narasu no da
(Videoclip) Tegami: Kitarubeki Ongaku to Shite
(Special Track) Making Clip – Seishun Kyōsōkyoku (Samba Version)
(Special Track) Making Clip – Sekai wa Sore o Ai to Yobunda ze
(Special Track) Making Clip – Subete no Yoru to Subete no Asa ni Tambourine o Narasu no da
(Special Track) TV Commercial

Boku to Kimi no subete wa Hibiya yagahi Ongaku-do de Utae (December 6, 2006)
 Futari bocchi no Sekai
 Zetsubou to Yokubou to Otokonoko to Onnanoko
 Itoshisa to Kokoro no Kabe
 Utagoe yo okore
 Futatsu no Namida
 Sekai wa sore wo Ai to Yobunda ze
 Sensou to Boku
 Boku to kimi no subete wa Atarashiki Uta de Utae
 Utsukushiki Ningen no Hibi
 Subete no Yoru to subete no Asa ni Tanbarin wo Narasu no da
 Tegami
 Sono Nukumori ni You ga aru
 Nanigenakute idaina kimi
 Tsuki ni saku Hana no You ni Naru no
 Seishun Kyousoukyoku
 Asa

Sekai rokku senbatsu fainaru zenkyoku yatte ura natsu fesu o buttobashita hi (March 12, 2008)
 Utagoe yo okore
 Zanzou
 Kore de Jiyuu ni natta no Da
 Hito wa sore wo Jounetsu to Yobu
 Sayounara Baby
 Very Special!!
 Tsunagari
 Konoyo no Hate
 Omoide wa Yogisha ni notte
 Ano musume no mizugi ni natte mitai noda
 Zetsubou to Yokubou to Otokonoko to Onnanoko
 Sad ballad no Sekai
 Futari bocchi no Sekai
 Boku to Kimi no subete wa Atarashiki Uta de Utae
 Futari
 Netchu Jidai
 Seishun Kyousoukyoku
 Asa
 Anata ga hito o uragirunara boku wa dare ka o koroshite shimatta sa
 Sekai wa soredemo Shizun de Ikundaze
 Yogisha de yattekita aitsu
 Muffler no Yoreru Aida ni
 Oh Baby
 Yoru ga Aketara
 Yoyogi ni te
 Baby Baby Sue
 Baby Yasashi Yoru ga Kitte
 Dan Dan
 Kyoukai Mae Toori
 Ubai toru koto nitsuite
 Coaster
 Soredemo Kamawanai
 Boku ni Sasagu
 Kimi no Koe wa Boku no Koi Boku wo Na wa Kimi no Yoru
 Shoumatsu soul
 Ano kane o Narasu no wa anata
 Itoshiki Hibi
 Hanarae nai Futari
 Futatsu no Namida
 Yokubou rock
 Get back Sambomaster
 Tokyo no Yoru sayounara
 Atsui suna to warui Ame
 Sensou to Boku
 Ame
 Nanigenakute idaina Kimi
 I love you
 Shinnon Fukei
 Tegami
 Itoshisato Kokoro no Kabe
 Utsushiki Ningen no Hibi
 Subete no Yoru to subete no Asa ni Tanbarin wo Narasu no Da
 Tsuki ni saku Hana no You ni naru no
 Sekai wa sore wo Ai to Yobunda ze
 Sono Nukumori ni You ga aru

Other albums
Hōkago no Seishun (July 2, 2003)
Sambomaster appeared in a split album with the band Onanie Machine. This is the first appearance of some of Sambomaster's future hit songs, such as "Utsukushiki Ningen no Hibi", "Tegami", and "Sononukumori ni Yō ga Aru" (as well as the other two in their own right). The versions on this album feature only Takeshi, Yasufumi, and Yoichi playing the songs. Later versions, such as the versions on their singles and albums, were touched up, polished, re-mixed, and sometimes re-recorded with extra musicians. In a sense, the songs on this album are the "original" versions. Sambomaster songs are tracks 6 to 10 below:
 Mendokusee
 Lovewagon
 Boku wa Stalker
 Soshiki
 Pokochin
 Sayonara Baby
 Utsukushiki Ningen no Hibi
 Tegami
 Futari
 Sono Nukumori ni Yō ga Aru

E.V. Junkies II "Guitarocking" (June 30, 2004)
Sambomaster has 2 songs on this compilation album, tracks 9 and 14 below. "Itoshiki Hibi: Country Sad Ballad ver." is a version with Alice singing most of the vocals.
 Kimi to iu Hana / Asian Kung-Fu Generation
 Magic Words / Straightener
 Mountain a Go Go / CaptainStraydum
 Shalilala / Flow
 Ima made nan domo / The Massmissile
 Nostalgic / The Droogies
 Jitterbug / Ellegarden
 Gunjō / Tsubakiya Quartette
 Tsunagari / Sambomaster
 Shiroi Koe / Lunkhead
 Boku no Sonzai wa Uso janakatta / Outlaw
 Alive / Raico
 Rakuyou: Long Ver. / Orange Range
 Itoshiki Hibi: Country Sad Ballad ver. / Alice meets Sambomaster

Magokoro Covers (September 1, 2004)

Sambomaster recorded a cover of Magokoro Brothers' "Dear John Lennon" in this compilation album.
 Endless Summer Nude (Tomita Lab. Remix) / 冨田ラボ
 Sora ni Maiagare / Okuda Tamio
 Ai / Halcali
 Loop Slider / Suneohair
 Ningen wa Mō Owari da! / Puffy
 Stone / Tokyo Ska Paradise Orchestra
 Standard 3 / Rosetta Garden
 Haikei, John Lennon / Sambomaster
 Baby Baby Baby / Yuki
 Subarashiki kono Sekai / Imawano Kiyoshirō
 Atarashii Yoake / MB's

Koi no Mon original soundtrack (September 23, 2004)
Sambomaster was featured in the original soundtrack of the movie Koi no Mon. Sambomaster songs are tracks 1, 2, 14, 15, and 18 below:
 Tsuki ni Saku Hana no Yō ni Naru no
 Hito wa Sore o Jōnetsu to Yobu
 Mohawk!
 Four Finger
 Noiko no Heya
 Aquam
 Ishi ga ite, Kimi ga ite
 Big Site
 Fukashigi Jikken Karada Gibarengaa
 Fortress Europe
 Office Blue
 Agatha
 S
 Kono yo no Hate: koi no mon short version
 Kono yo no Hate: koi no mon strings version
 6:27
 Kaisō
 Sambomaster wa Shūmatsu ni Soul Instrument o suru no da no Kan
 Koi no Mon

References

External links
Sambomaster's Official Site
Sony Music's Official Site

Japanese rock music groups
Japanese alternative rock groups
Sony Music Entertainment Japan artists
Musical groups from Tokyo